The 1971 World Women's Handball Championship took place in the Netherlands between 11-19 December 1971. After the 1968 edition was cancelled because of the intervention of Czechoslovakia from the Soviet Union, the 1971 edition would see East Germany take the title as they defeated Yugoslavia 11-8 in the final.

Premlinary Round

Group A

Group B

Group C

Main round

Group A

Group B

Ranking Round

Placement Round

Fifth Place Playoff

Third Place Playoff

Final

Final standings

References

 International Handball Federation

W
W
World Handball Championship tournaments
W
Women's handball in the Netherlands
World Women's Handball Championship
1971 in Dutch women's sport